The Legislature XVI of Italy started on 29 April 2008 and ended on 14 March 2013. Its composition resulted from the snap election of 13–14 April 2008, called after President Giorgio Napolitano dissolved the houses on 6 February 2008. The dissolution of the Parliament was a consequence of the defeat of the incumbent government led by Romano Prodi during a vote of confidence in the Senate.

The legislature was dissolved by President Napolitano on 22 December 2012, a few months before the end of its natural five-year term.

Government

Composition

Chamber of Deputies

The number of elected deputies is 630.

 President: Gianfranco Fini (PdL until 30 July 2010, then FLI), elected on 30 April 2008
 Vice Presidents: Maurizio Lupi (PdL), Antonio Leone (PdL), Rosy Bindi (PD), Rocco Buttiglione (UdC)

Senate

The number of elected senators was 315. At the start of the legislature there were seven life senators (Francesco Cossiga, Oscar Luigi Scalfaro and Carlo Azeglio Ciampi as former Presidents, as well as nominated life senators Giulio Andreotti, Rita Levi-Montalcini, Emilio Colombo and Sergio Pininfarina), making the total number of senators 322. At the end of the legislature, after the deaths of Cossiga, Scalfaro, Levi-Montalcini and Pininfarina, and the nomination of a new life senator (Mario Monti) the total number of senators went down to 319.

 President: Renato Schifani (PdL), elected on 29 April 2008
 Vice Presidents: Rosi Mauro (LN, then Mixed), Domenico Nania (PdL), Valerio Chiti (PD), Emma Bonino (RI)

References

Legislatures of Italy